LGBT tourism (or gay tourism) is a form of tourism marketed to gay, lesbian, bisexual, and transgender (LGBT) people. People might be open about their sexual orientation and gender identity at times, but less so in areas known for violence against LGBT people.

The main components of LGBT tourism include: destinations, accommodations, and travel services wishing to attract LGBT tourists; people looking to travel to LGBT-friendly destinations; people wanting to travel with other LGBT people when traveling regardless of the destination; and LGBT travelers who are mainly concerned with cultural and safety issues. The slang term gaycation has come to imply a version of a vacation that includes a pronounced aspect of LGBT culture, either in the journey or destination. The LGBT tourism industry includes destinations (tourism offices and CVBs), travel agents, accommodations and hotel groups, tour companies, cruise lines, and travel advertising and promotions companies who market these destinations to the gay community. Coinciding with the increased visibility of LGBT people raising children in the 1990s, an increase in family-friendly LGBT tourism has emerged in the 2000s, for instance R Family Vacations which includes activities and entertainment geared towards couples including same-sex weddings. R Family's first cruise was held aboard Norwegian Cruise Lines's Norwegian Dawn with 1600 passengers including 600 children.

Major companies in the travel industry have become aware of the substantial money (also known as the "pink dollar" or "pink pound") generated by this marketing niche and have made it a point to align themselves with the gay community and gay tourism campaigns. According to a 2000 Travel University report, 10% of international tourists were gays and lesbians,  accounting for more than 70 million arrivals worldwide. This market segment is expected to continue to grow as a result of ongoing acceptance of LGBT people and changing attitudes towards sexual and gender minorities. Outside larger companies, LGBT tourists are offered other traditional tourism tools, such as networks of LGBT individuals who offer each other hospitality during their travels and even home swaps where people live in each other's homes.  Also available worldwide are social groups for resident and visiting gay, lesbian, bisexual, and transgender expatriates and friends.

LGBT travel destinations

LGBT-friendly travel destinations are popularly known because they usually maintain welcoming attitudes, with local leaders and business owners instilling a consciousness and positive awareness of LGBT travelers to their fellow inhabitants and employees. These locales also feature infrastructure, businesses and services whose representatives are sensitive to and friendly with LGBT travelers; this includes everything from bars, travel agencies/guides, restaurants, hotels, resorts, nightlife, entertainment, media, political/legal aid and, more than anything, the opportunity to meet others and socialize.

Gay travel destinations are often medium to large cities, and can coincide with the existence of gay neighborhoods. These neighborhoods often work actively to develop their reputations as safe and fun, specifically for LGBT people, to travel to. LGBT travel guide Queer in the World states,  "The fabulosity of Gay New York is unrivaled on Earth, and queer culture seeps into every corner of its five boroughs".

According to GayTravel.com (in 2019) the top gay-friendly destinations in the world are:
 Puerto Vallarta, Mexico
 New York City, USA
 Tel Aviv, Israel
 San Francisco, USA
 London, England
 Bangkok, Thailand
 Miami, USA
 Amsterdam, Netherlands
 Madrid, Spain
 Berlin, Germany
 Paris, France
 Toronto, Canada
 Copenhagen, Denmark
 Buenos Aires, Argentina
 Brighton, England
 Palm Springs, USA
 São Paulo, Brazil
 Hong Kong, China
 Tokyo, Japan
 Barcelona, Spain

Other notable LGBT destinations include Sydney in Australia, Palm Springs, USA, Mykonos and Lesbos in Greece, Gran Canary island and Ibiza in Mediterranean Spain.

The LGBT tourism industry is highly profitable; an average of US$65 billion is spent on gay travel in the USA alone, annually. According to In Europe, the gay tourism market has been estimated at €50 billion per year by the Gay European Tourism Association. The adult LGBT community in the USA had a total economic spending power of more than $600 billion annually, as of 2007 (according to Witeck-Combs), and by 2016 this had risen to $917 billion. Some governments tend to highlight this for foreign visitors, like the official US website that promotes historic New York places in Greenwich Village, such as the Stonewall Inn or Eve's Hangout, that are well-known sites to visit for Europeans.

Philadelphia was the first destination in the world to create and air a television commercial specifically marketed towards gay tourists. Philadelphia was also the first destination to commission a research study, aimed at a specific destination, to learn about gay travel to a specific city.

Tourism planners 

The International Gay and Lesbian Travel Association (IGLTA) holds an annual world convention and four symposia in different tourism destinations around the world. Each symposium attracts over 500 representatives of convention & visitor bureaus, tour agencies and travel publications that specialize in the gay and lesbian market. The association was founded in 1983, and it currently represents over 2000 members. Its headquarters are in Fort Lauderdale, Florida. The "17th International Conference on Gay & Lesbian Tourism" was held in Las Vegas, Nevada, United States, on 11–13 December 2016.  

With nine issues a year, Passport Magazine is currently the only gay and lesbian travel magazine still in publication in the United States.  It is available internationally. Spartacus International and FunMaps of Maplewood, New Jersey have promoted gay- and lesbian-friendly businesses since 1982. One of Europe's gay and lesbian travel marketing specialists is Out Now Consulting.

The Gay European Tourism Association (GETA) works to promote and enhance LGBT tourism in Europe.

LGBT activist Juan P. Julia Blanch opened first Gay-friendly hotel chain Axel Hotels in different cities and countries around the world.

LGBT events

According to GayTravel.com the top ten best gay pride events are:
 Sydney Mardi Gras
 Amsterdam’s Canal Parade
 Berlin Pride
 Buenos Aires gay pride event
 San Francisco Pride Celebration
 London’s Pride Festival
 New York City Pride
 Madrid Pride
 Montreal
 Pensacola Memorial Day Weekend.

The Lesbian and Gay City Festival in Berlin started in 1993 and about 450,000 – 500,000 people attend every year.  

A few more to note:  These are the largest but in unique categories, the first is the largest “unofficial gay pride event”, the second is the largest free gay pride event, and the third is the largest small town gay pride event:

Gay Days at Walt Disney World in Orlando, Florida.  This is held the first weekend in June and is one of the biggest unofficial gay pride events in the world.  Since Gay Days started, about 150,000 people attend this six-day event that includes “17 pool parties, a business expo, a comic-book convention, a film festival, an after-hours trip to a Disney water park (think dance music and guys in very small swimsuits), bobble-head painting, and tie-dying for the kids, rivers of alcohol for the adults, and on June 5th the great culmination: 20,000 to 30,000 lesbians, gays, and their families and friends descending on Disney World, everyone clad in red shirts to signify their presence. (Cloud)”

Seattle Pride in Seattle, Washington. It's held the last weekend of June, and it is the largest free pride festival in the country. It includes the Capitol Hill Pride Festival that has outdoor stages, a Kids Zone that has family entertainment until 6pm- events after 6pm are 21 and over. Then on Sunday is the Gay Pride Parade that goes through downtown Seattle and ends at a larger festival at the Seattle Center.  It includes “4 stages, world-class entertainment, action and advocacy for the LGBT community, and thousands of vendors.

East-Central Minnesota Pride in Pine City, Minnesota.  It's held the first weekend in June and, in 2005, it was the first small town gay pride in the United States.  It has endured despite protests from conservative Christians, and it bills itself as "Minnesota's Small Town Gay Pride!", pulling people in from across east-central Minnesota and beyond.

LGBT travel resources

Many OTA travel websites now feature LGBT travel search options. The most popular travel resources are still ones from local LGBT media organizations and online LGBT news and lifestyle websites. Additional destination-specific LGBT travel information is commonly found on niche gay travel blogs. The U.S. Department of State- Bureau of Consular Affairs now offers information about LGBT travel and provides tips about what one can do before traveling. It also provides information about different issues one should take care of before traveling. 

In 69 UN member states, there are laws that criminalize consensual same-sex relationships, making it important to check the laws of the country before travelling to avoid issues and persecution.

See also

 Meeting of the Friends of Dorothy
 Gay naturism
 Gay-friendly
 Gaylocator
 LGBT cruises
 LGBT marketing
 LGBT tourism in South Africa
 Sydney Gay and Lesbian Mardi Gras

References

Report on the number and value of gay European tourists – by GETA – the Gay European Tourism Association (2013).

Sources
Cloud, J. (2010). "Gay Days in the Magic Kingdom". Time, 175(24), 69–70.

Link, M. (2007). "Fantastic family fun". Advocate, (983), 52–53.

Scott Gatz. (2009). Advocate, (1027/1028), 87.

External links

 
Types of tourism